National Highway 01 or NH01, formally called the Ring Road, is a  two-lane road network circulating inside Afghanistan, connecting the following major cities (clockwise): Kabul, Maidan Shar, Ghazni, Kandahar, Delaram, Herat, Maymana, Sheberghan, Mazar-i-Sharif, Puli Khumri and back to Kabul. It has extensions that connect Jalalabad, Bamyan, Khost, Lashkargah, Zaranj (Route 606), Farah, Islam Qala, Torghundi, and Kunduz. It is part of AH1, the longest route of the Asian Highway Network. National Highway 01 consists of four major sections, NH0101 to NH0104, linking the major economic centers.

History 
Part of National Highway 1 has been refurbished since late 2003, particularly the Kabul–Kandahar Highway, with funds provided by the United States, Saudi Arabia and others. Most work on that stretch was done by Turkish, Indian and local companies. Japanese companies were also involved near the southern Afghan province of Kandahar. In the west, Iran participated in the two-lane road construction between Islam Qala and the western Afghan city of Herat. Pakistan rebuilt the Jalalabad–Kabul Road.

Kabul to Kandahar
The Kabul–Kandahar Highway (NH0101) is a  section of National Highway 01 linking two of Afghanistan's largest cities, Kabul and Kandahar. This highway is a key portion of the Ring Road. Approximately 35 percent of Afghanistan's population lives within  of the Kabul to Kandahar portion of the Ring Road.

The Kabul–Kandahar highway underwent major repairs carried out by the United States and Japanese governments with assistance in planning and design by Turkish and Indian engineers. Phase one of paving was completed in December 2003 and the highway was opened to traffic.  However, the road has badly deteriorated since that time, from heavy trucks and also from terrorist sabotage. Furthermore, armed guards must protect highway repair crews from ambushes. Banditry and extortion at Taliban checkpoints continue to be problems.

Kandahar to Herat

National Highway 01 between Kandahar and Herat consists of two sections, NH0101, running from Kandahar to Delaram, and NH0102, running from Delaram to Herat.

Kabul to Jalalabad 

The two-lane Kabul Gorge highway runs along  cliffs. Fatal traffic accidents occur in this area, mainly due to reckless driving.

See also
 Transport in Afghanistan

Notes

AH1
Roads in Afghanistan